Sunch'ŏn is a city in South Pyongan province, North Korea.  It has a population of 297,317, and is home to various manufacturing plants. The city is on the Taedong River.

History 
In 1413, the name of the city became Sunchon, due to a renaming rule in the early Joseon, where 'ju (州)' were changed to 'chon (川)' and became Sunchon-gun. The original name referred to a smooth repelling of invaders.

In 1983, the county was elevated into a city and became Sunchon-si and a number of administrative districts were reorganised. Various other administrative division changes occurred until remaining in its current form from 2003.

In December 1951, the Korean War aerial Battle of Sunch'ŏn was fought near Sunch'ŏn between the Royal Australian Air Force and two North Korean allies – China and the Soviet Union.

Administrative divisions
Sunch'ŏn-si is divided into 21 tong (neighbourhoods) and 11 ri (villages):

Economy

Electricity generation 
The city has a thermal power station, the Sunchon Thermal Power Plant, which has an estimated installed capacity of 20 MW, although in 2009, it generated only on average 10 MW over the year. For the 80 day campaign of the 8th Congress of the Workers' Party of Korea, it was reported that the generation equipment at this power station had been overhauled and  restored to its original state. A campaign was waged to keep generation capacity at the maximum.

Cement industry 
Sunchon has a developed industry. The Sunchon Cement Complex has the capability to produce millions of tons of cement each year for use within North Korea but also exported to other countries. The plant has participated in major construction projects, such as the plan for 10,000 flats in Pyongyang in 2021. It has direct access to the Sunchon Limestone mine and the Sunchon Gypsum mine.

Chemical industry 
The city has a Vinylon factory, and other chemical factories producing carbide, methanol and various chemical fertilisers. One of the most important pharmaceutical companies of North Korea, the Sunchon Pharmaceutical factory produces penicillin, streptomycin and rifampicin.

Agriculture 
Due to a lack of an irrigation system, before liberation, Sunchon was only suitable for millets. This was extensively developed after liberation and the city now plants beans, corn, rice and barley. Various fruits and vegetables are also grown and a range of animals are raised.

Transportation
Sunch'ŏn Station is on the P'yŏngra and Manp'o lines of the Korean State Railway. Taegon Line and various other industrial lines pass through the city.

The city is on multiple important roads to Pyongyang, Kanggye, Pyongsong and Hamhung.

Culture 
The city has various primary schools, secondary schools, vocational schools and universities. Other facilities include a library, a hospital and a sanatorium.

Sister cities
 Atuntaqui, Imbabura Province, Ecuador

See also

List of cities in North Korea
Geography of North Korea

References

Further reading
Dormels, Rainer. North Korea's Cities: Industrial facilities, internal structures and typification. Jimoondang, 2014.

External links
City profile of Sunchon 

Cities in South Pyongan